(Cantor at St. Thomas) is the common name for the musical director of the , now an internationally known boys' choir founded in Leipzig in 1212. The official historic title of the Thomaskantor in Latin, describes the two functions of cantor and director. As the cantor, he prepared the choir for service in four Lutheran churches, Thomaskirche (St. Thomas), Nikolaikirche (St. Nicholas), Neue Kirche (New Church) and Peterskirche (St. Peter). As director, he organized music for city functions such as town council elections and homages. Functions related to the university took place at the Paulinerkirche. 
Johann Sebastian Bach was the most famous , from 1723 to 1750.

Position 
Leipzig has had a university dating back to 1409, and is a commercial center, hosting a trade fair first mentioned in 1165. It has been mostly Lutheran since the Reformation. The position of Thomaskantor at Bach's time has been described as "one of the most respected and influential musical offices of Protestant Germany.

The readings and required music of the Lutheran services in Leipzig were regulated in detail. The Church Book (Complete Church / Book / Containing / The Gospels and Epistles / For Every Feast-, Sun-, and Apostle Day 
Of the Entire Year ...) lists the prescribed readings, repeated every year. The church year began with the First Sunday in Advent and was divided in feast days, fasting
periods and the feast-less time after Trinity Sunday. For music, there was mainly no concert music such as a cantata during the fasting times of Advent and Lent. Modest music was performed during the second half of the church year, and rich music with more complex instrumentation and more services per day on feast days. Christmas, Easter and Pentecost were celebrated for three days each, and many other feast days were observed. The library of St. Thomas contained works in vocal polyphony from the fifteenth century onward.

The Thomaskantor reported to the city council, the rector of the Thomasschule and the church superintendent. He had the duty to prepare the choir for service in the city's four Lutheran churches: the main churches Thomaskirche (St. Thomas) and the Nikolaikirche (St. Nicholas), and also the Neue Kirche (New Church) and the Peterskirche (St. Peter).

As cantor, the Thomaskantor had to compose and take care of copying, rehearsals and performances. He also had to teach music and general subjects. He took part in the admission process for new students to the school. The choir was divided in groups: the most advanced singers performed a cantata every Sunday, alternating between St. Thomas and St. Nicholas, a second group sang at the other church, beginners on feast days at the smaller churches. On high holidays, the cantata was performed in both churches, a morning service in one and a vespers service in the other. To earn additional funding, the choir performed also for weddings and funerals.

As director of music, the Thomaskantor was Leipzig's "senior musician", responsible for the music on official occasions such as town council elections and homages. Functions related to the university took place at the Paulinerkirche.

Today, the  leads the music in services at the Thomaskirche, including weekly afternoon services called Motette which often contain a Bach cantata. He also conducts the choir in recordings and on tours.

Known holders of the position 
The following table shows the names of the known people in the position, and their time of service, in chronological order from the Reformation to now.

Notes

References

Bibliography 

 
 
 
 
 
 Stefan Altner: Das Thomaskantorat im 19. Jahrhundert. Bewerber und Kandidaten für das Leipziger Thomaskantorat in den Jahren 1842 bis 1918. Quellenstudien zur Entwicklung des Thomaskantorats und des Thomanerchors vom Wegfall der öffentlichen Singumgänge 1837 bis zur ersten Auslandsreise 1920. Passage-Verlag, Leipzig 2006, .
 Johann Gottfried Stallbaum: Über den innern Zusammenhang musikalischer Bildung der Jugend mit dem Gesammtzwecke des Gymnasiums. Eine Inauguralrede, nebst biographischen Nachrichten über die Cantoren an der Thomasschule zu Leipzig. Fritzsche, Leipzig 1842.

External links 
 Ordnung / Der Schule / zu S. Thomæ, Leipzig 1723 (PDF, in German)
 The Leipzig City Council’s Statutes for St. Thomas School, Leipzig 1723 (PDF)

 
St. Thomas School, Leipzig